Radulinopsisis a genus of marine ray-finned fishes belonging to the family Cottidae, the typical sculpins. These fishes are found in the northwestern Pacific Ocean.

Species
There are currently two recognized species in this genus:
 Radulinopsis derjavini Soldatov & Lindberg, 1930
 Radulinopsis taranetzi Yabe & Maruyama, 2001

References

Cottinae